Heracleum is a genus of biennial and perennial herbs in the carrot family Apiaceae. They are found throughout the temperate northern hemisphere and in high mountains as far south as Ethiopia. Common names for the genus or its species include hogweed and cow parsnip.

The genus name Heracleum was described by Carl Linnaeus in 1753. It derives from the Ancient Greek  "of Heracles", referring to the mythological hero.

Species

Many species of the genus Heracleum are similar in appearance. An outlier is H. mantegazzianum, the large size of which is exceptional. Common species include:
 Heracleum mantegazzianum, giant hogweed, native to the western Caucasus region of Eurasia, a serious invasive species in many areas of Europe and North America
 Heracleum sosnowskyi, Sosnowsky's hogweed, native to the eastern Caucasus, a common weed throughout Europe and Asia
 Heracleum persicum, Persian hogweed, native to Iran, Iraq, and Turkey
 Heracleum sphondylium, common hogweed, native to Europe and Asia
 Heracleum maximum, cow parsnip, native and common in North America

, Plants of the World Online accepts the following 88 species:, it had previously in 2019, up to 148.

Classification and naming
Other than size, the related species H. mantegazzianum, H. sosnowskyi, and H. persicum have very similar characteristics. The common name giant hogweed usually refers to H. mantegazzianum alone but in some locales that common name refers to all three species as a group. Both H. maximum and H. sphondylium are often referred to as cow parsnip. To avoid confusion, these species are sometimes referred to as American cow parsnip and European cow parsnip, respectively.

The morphological similarity of species within the genus Heracleum and the difficulty of botanical identification has led to numerous synonyms and naming issues. For example, the classification of the species now widely known as H. maximum has been inconsistent. In the literature, the scientific names H. lanatum, H. maximum, and others are used interchangeably. Prior to 2000, the former name was most popular, but today the latter name is in vogue.

Phototoxic effects
Most species of the genus Heracleum are known to cause phytophotodermatitis. In particular, the public health risks of giant hogweed (H. mantegazzianum) are well known.

At least 36 species of the genus Heracleum have been reported to contain furanocoumarin, a chemical compound that sensitizes human skin to sunlight. Of those, at least 25 species contained a psoralen derivative, either bergapten (5-methoxypsoralen) or methoxsalen (8-methoxypsoralen). Three of those species (H. mantegazzianum, H. sosnowskyi, and H. sphondylium) were found to contain both psoralen derivatives.

References

Taxa named by Carl Linnaeus
Apioideae
Poisonous plants
Apioideae genera